PlayStation Official Magazine – UK, generally abbreviated as OPM, was a magazine based in the United Kingdom that covered PlayStation news created in 2006. Although the first issue was distributed in three-month intervals, from Issue 2 onward, it became a monthly segment. From Issue 7 to Issue 84, the magazine came with a playable Blu-ray disc; it primarily covered PlayStation 4, PlayStation 4 Pro, PlayStation VR and PlayStation 5 games and material. It also covered PlayStation Vita material. The magazine covered PlayStation, as well as all aspects of HD media in lesser detail.

On 30 April 2021, GamesRadar+ announced that the Official PlayStation Magazine title would end, citing "along with Sony we felt that the Official PlayStation Magazine had finally earned a well-deserved retirement", and the magazine would be relaunched as Play. Staff would remain the same, while subscribers to OPM would continue to be subscribed with the issues number resetting.

Official UK PlayStation Magazine

The Official UK PlayStation Magazine is a now-defunct magazine, launched in November 1995 to coincide with the launch of the PlayStation console. It ran for 108 issues, with the last hitting news stands in March 2004. The first issue sold 37,000 copies. Roughly midway through its run the abbreviations in the magazine changed from PSM to OPM (this was mainly because another magazine by the name of PSM2 was launched in the 4th quarter of 2000, and so as not to cause confusion, the abbreviations of the official magazine were changed to OPM). It had 3 design changes in its lifetime: 1 to 51, 52 to 72, and finally 73 to 108.

The first game to be reviewed was Wipeout, which received 8/10. The last game to be reviewed was Ford Truck Mania, which garnered 7/10.

The magazine would go on to become not only the best selling PlayStation magazine in the United Kingdom, but the best selling videogames magazine in the world. By mid-1997, PSM was selling over 150,000 issues a month. In the month of February 1999, issue 42 (cover game: Metal Gear Solid), according to ABC the magazine managed a record 453,571, beating the UK's biggest lads magazines FHM, Maxim and Loaded.

Official UK PlayStation 2 Magazine

Official UK PlayStation 2 Magazine (often abbreviated to OPS2) was launched in December 2000 as the sequel publication to the Official UK PlayStation Magazine, originally priced £4.99, to coincide with the launch of the PlayStation 2 console. Each month the magazine came with a cover-mounted playable demo DVD. It ran for 100 issues, with the last going on sale in the month of July 2008. The magazine was commonly abbreviated OPS2. It had four design changes in its lifetime: 1 to 25, 26 to 41, 42 to 89, and finally 90 to 100.

The first game to be reviewed was Tekken Tag Tournament, which received 8/10. The last game to be reviewed was SBK-08: Superbike World Championship, which earned 7/10. The magazine would go on to become the UK's best selling PlayStation 2 magazine, peaking with 197,348 readers in 2002.

Target demographic
In the beginning OPS2 was designed for the early adopter – encompassing hardcore gamers and previous readers crossing over from the original Official UK PlayStation Magazine. This ran from issue 1 (December 2000) to 25 (October 2002). Starting from issue 26, the magazine was set the task of attracting a more mass market, mainstream audience. This included a full redesign. From issue 34, OPS2 changed again – however this time retaining its recent redesign. In a drastic attempt to attract a more young male demographic – similar to that of the independent PlayStation magazines of the '90s – the publication decided to “review“ readers girlfriends and their mothers and increased the number of scantily-clad women, even to the point of including bare breasts. It received a mixed response from readers, and failed to considerably increase the readership. In turn, the magazine featured another redesign from issue 42. OPS2 would retain this middle ground for the next three years, neither employing an overly male nor hardcore adult gamer stance. In the final year, as the PlayStation 2 entered a more family-friendly stage, OPS2 changed once more; this time for its final time. Starting from issue 90 the magazine would focus on new PS2 owners and the younger gamer.

Awards
In 2004, OPSM2 won the prestigious Industry Dinner Magazine of the Year Award.
In 2004, OPSM2 publication won MCV's Magazine Team of the Year Award.
In 1998 and 1999, OPSM won the prestigious Industry Dinner Magazine of the Year Award.

Regular features
The magazine's design follows the same approximate structure each issue. Recurring segments include:
The Big 10, in which the ten most momentous PlayStation-related pieces of news are discussed.
Agenda, which contains the game sales charts for all three major PlayStation platforms as well as a Personal column and regulars like Culture, where PlayStation super fans show off their art, models and tributes. It also shows off the latest Sony gadgets (mainly phones and cameras) as well as "Lust have kit".
Previews and reviews sections.
Blu-ray movies section in which the latest Blu-ray releases are reviewed.
Contact, in which letters and emails from readers are shown and replied to, this section also includes a corner dedicated to "what's on my hard drive" where people talk about what games, videos, music, photos and friends are on their PS3 and several wall posts from the Official U.S. PlayStation Magazine Facebook page.
Directory, which houses a "Buyer's Guide" for games for the main platforms as well as for HDTVs.

OPM
From issues #1 to #51, the magazine followed a set format every month:
 StartUp (featuring a quick run through of the games featured on the cover disc and editor's letter)
 Update  (news, interviews and first looks. With each page, a 'Loading Bar' percentage increased)
 PrePlay (previews)
 Letters (this was later moved to the back of the magazine in a section called 'Down Loading')
 Features
 PlayTest (reviews)
 Cheats (later called 'Top Secret', a special section which was printed on recycled paper)
 Down Loading
 On the CD (demo game controls)
 Next Month

OPS2
 Spy (news and the latest announcements)
 Monitor (previews, as voted for by the readers)
 Features
 Next Month
 Letters
 Replay (looking at previously reviewed titles, review A to Z, cheats)
 Comedown (DVD and Music reviews)
 On the Disc

Demo disc

Each month the publication comes with a cover mounted playable demo disc — a first for a console magazine. The disc contains game demos and other PlayStation-related content which have to be downloaded and installed onto the PS3's hard drive.

Although some of the demos are also available on the PlayStation Network, there will be some exclusive content on certain discs. It has also been stated that the magazine will receive exclusive content in the future to be published on the disc.

Reviews
Usually, one member of the team is assigned to review a certain new game, although on occasion other staff members will provide "2up" or a second opinion.  Sometimes there are also pie charts to describe the contents, or what you do in the game.  Also used are score poles to compare reviews, as well as describing the influences.  And as with the "2up" segment, there is a "dev talk" article giving a short statement from the games developer. Reviews are scored out of ten.

The magazine also presents its "highest accolade", the Gold Award, to any game that its staff believe "demonstrates significant innovation, near-flawless gameplay, great graphics and long-lasting appeal." Games do not necessarily have to have a perfect 10 out of 10 score to receive it; those that have received this award include FIFA 09, FIFA 11, Metal Gear Solid 4: Guns of the Patriots, Mirror's Edge, Grand Theft Auto IV, Warhawk, The Elder Scrolls IV: Oblivion, Call of Duty 4: Modern Warfare, Siren: Blood Curse, Uncharted: Drake's Fortune, Soulcalibur IV, LittleBigPlanet, Resistance 2, Ratchet & Clank Future: Tools of Destruction, Ratchet & Clank: A Crack in Time, Infamous, BioShock, Uncharted 2: Among Thieves, Killzone 2, Assassin's Creed II, Heavy Rain, and Red Dead Redemption for the PlayStation 3; Tomb Raider: Anniversary for the PlayStation 2; and God of War: Chains of Olympus and Final Fantasy Tactics: The War of the Lions for the PlayStation Portable.

The only game to receive a 0 rating was the DVD version of Time Traveler.

Editorial staff
As of Issue 140, the team listed on the magazine's first page consists of:
Ian Dean – Editor
Milford Coppock – Managing art editor
Miriam McDonald – Operations editor
Oscar Taylor-Kent – Games editor
Jessica Kinghorn – Staff writer

Top Ten Readers Poll
In issue 50 (October 2010), the magazine published the results of the readers poll on the greatest PlayStation title ever released.

Desert Island Games
In the final March 2004 issue, the magazine published their list of the official top 10 PlayStation games of all time.

Hall of Fame
With the new look, the magazine published their Hall of Fame for each platform.

References

External links
 
Archived Official PlayStation UK Magazines on the Internet Archive

Video game magazines published in the United Kingdom
Defunct computer magazines published in the United Kingdom
Magazines established in 1995
Magazines established in 2006
Magazines disestablished in 2004
Monthly magazines published in the United Kingdom
PlayStation (brand) magazines
2006 establishments in the United Kingdom